AFH or afh may refer to:
 
 Adaptive frequency-hopping spread spectrum, a radio technology
 Adult foster home, residence for elderly or physically disabled adults
 Afrihili language (ISO 639-3 code: afh)
 Angiomatoid fibrous histiocytoma, a human tumour
 Architecture for Humanity, a charitable organization
 Action for Happiness, a charity in the United Kingdom